The 1914–15 Montreal Canadiens season was the team's sixth season and sixth of the National Hockey Association (NHA). After finishing first in 1913–14, the club posted a 6–14 record and fell to last place in the league.

Regular season

Five new players joined the Canadiens in 1914–15: Albert Corbeau, Jack Fournier, Nick Bawlf, Ed Lowrey and Marcel Beliveau. Didier Pitre returns to the Canadiens from Vancouver after a cash deal with the Millionaires. Newsy Lalonde holds out in a contract dispute, prompting the team to penalize him $100 per week. After Lalonde returns in January, he plays poorly and is suspended by the team again. He only plays seven games of the season.

On January 13 in a game versus Quebec, Georges Vezina is penalized and tossed from the game for hitting Joe Hall. With the Bulldogs behind 2–1, Jack Laviolette takes over in goal, and Quebec ties the game. As was then permitted, Vezina returns in extra play, only to surrender the third Quebec goal in a game that went on record as the longest overtime to that point, taking fifty minutes and 28 seconds to settle the contest.

Final standings

Results

Playoffs
The team did not qualify for the playoffs.

Player statistics

Awards and records

Transactions
In November, Didier Pitre returned to Montreal from the Vancouver Millionaires for cash.
In February, Donald Smith is traded to the Wanderers for cash.

See also
 1914–15 NHA season

References

Montreal Canadiens seasons
Montreal Canadiens season, 1914-15